Jochem P. Hanse is a former Commissioner of the Netherlands Foreign Investment Agency. In June 2007, he was awarded the Order of the Rising Sun, Gold Rays with Neck Ribbon, by the Japanese government, in recognition of his contributions to promote tighter economic relations between Japan and the Netherlands.

References 

Living people
Recipients of the Order of the Rising Sun, 3rd class
Year of birth missing (living people)